The Flesh Eating Rollerskate Holiday Joyride is a holiday album by American comedy metal band Psychostick, released in the United States on September 25, 2007, through Rock Ridge Music. It is the band's final release to feature bassist Mike Kocian.

As of October 2007, "The Flesh Eating Rollerskate Holiday Joyride" had reached No. 18 on Billboard's Top Holiday Albums.

Track listing

Personnel
Psychostick is:
 Robert "Rawrb!" Kersey (Lead Vocals)
 Joshua "The J" Key (Guitar, Vocals)
 Mike "MiketheEvil" Kocian (Bass guitar, Vocals)
 Alex "Shmalex" Preiss (Drums)
 Guest Appearances:
 2001 AHS Band on "Doom to the World"
 Jason Hallack (group vocals)
 Produced by Psychostick
 Mixed and Engineered by Joshua "The J" Key
 Artwork by Robert "Rawrb" Kersey
 Anime X-Mas Zombie artwork by Kat "The Darkness Kitten" Fetteroll
 Tracking at Toxic Recording
 Flesh Eating Rollerskate by Nick Church
 Mastered by Dave Shirk at Sonorus Mastering, Inc

Chart performance

References

Psychostick albums
2007 EPs
Rock Ridge Music EPs